The women's 200 metres event at the 2002 Commonwealth Games was held in Manchester City on 28–29 July 2002.

Medalists

Results

Heats
Qualification: First 3 of each heat (Q) and the next 4 fastest (q) qualified for the semifinals.

Wind:Heat 1: +0.2 m/s, Heat 2: 0.0 m/s, Heat 3: +0.1 m/s, Heat 4: +0.4 m/s

Semifinals
Qualification: First 4 of each heat qualified directly (Q) for the final.

Wind:Heat 1: +0.2 m/s, Heat 2: –0.2 m/s

Final
Wind: 0.0 m/s

References
Official results
Results at BBC

200
2002
2002 in women's athletics